Halawet el-jibn ( / Ḥalāwat al-jibn) (cheese sweet) is a Syrian dessert made of a semolina and cheese dough, filled with cream. Its origin has been given as the city of Hama in Syria, though it is also claimed to be the city of Homs, It is found in other regions in the Middle East, and has been brought by Syrian immigrants to other countries such as Turkey and Germany.

Ingredients 

This dessert is primarily made of a cheese dough (containing Akkawi cheese, mozzarella, or some mix of cheeses), a sugar syrup, and orange blossom water or rose water. It is normally filled with cream (Qoshta) and decorated with pistachio.

References 

Desserts
Arab cuisine
Syrian cuisine
Levantine cuisine
Syrian snack foods